The 100th Air Refueling Wing (100th ARW), nicknamed the Bloody Hundredth, is a United States Air Force unit assigned to the Third Air Force, United States Air Forces in Europe – Air Forces Africa. It is stationed at RAF Mildenhall, Suffolk, United Kingdom. It is also the host wing at RAF Mildenhall.

The 100th ARW is the only permanent U.S. air refueling wing in the European theater, operating the Boeing KC-135R/T Stratotanker.

During World War II, its predecessor unit, the 100th Bombardment Group (Heavy), was an Eighth Air Force B-17 Flying Fortress unit in England, stationed at RAF Thorpe Abbotts. Flying over 300 combat missions, the group earned two Distinguished Unit Citations (Regensburg, 17 August 1943; Berlin, 4/6/8 March 1944). The group suffered tremendous losses in combat, with 177 aircraft missing in action (MIA), flying its last mission on 20 April 1945.

One of the wing's honors is that it is the only modern USAF operational wing allowed to display on its assigned aircraft the tail code (Square-D) of its World War II predecessor.

Units
USAFE's only Boeing KC-135R/T air refueling wing, it is responsible for U.S. aerial refueling operations conducted throughout the European theater. The unit supports some 16,000 personnel, including Third Air Force, four geographically separated units, and 15 associated units.

100th Operations Group (100th OG)
 351st Air Refueling Squadron (351st ARS)
 100th Operations Support Squadron (100th OSS)

100th Maintenance Group (100th MXG)
 100th Aircraft Maintenance Squadron (100th AMXS)
 100th Maintenance Squadron (100th MXS)
 100th Maintenance Operations Flight (100th MOF)

100th Mission Support Group (100th MSG)
 100th Civil Engineer Squadron (100th CES)
 100th Communications Squadron (100th CS)
 100th Logistics Readiness Squadron (100th LRS)
 100th Security Forces Squadron (100th SFS)
 100th Force Support Squadron (100th FSS)

History

World War II

On 1 June 1942, the Army Air Forces activated the 100th Bombardment Group (Heavy) (100th BG) as an unmanned paper unit assigned to III Bomber Command. The group remained unmanned until 27 October 1942, when a small number of men transferred from the 29th Bombardment Group to Gowen Field, Idaho, to serve as the group's initial cadre. Within four days, on 1 November, the small cadre forming the 100th BG moved the unit to Walla Walla Army Air Base, Washington, where it received its first four aircrews and four B-17Fs from the Boeing factory in Seattle. Following receipt of crews and aircraft, the 100th BG relocated to Wendover Field, Utah, on 30 November where it added additional personnel, aircraft, crews, and began operational training (bombing, gunnery, and navigation).

On New Year's Day of 1943, members of the fledgling group again transferred operations to two separate bases, with the aircraft and aircrews moving to Sioux City AAB, Iowa, while the ground echelon went to Kearney Army Air Field, Nebraska. In both instances, members of the 100th BG assisted in air and ground training for other groups bound for overseas. In mid-April, the aircrew element joined its ground echelon at Kearney and received new B-17s. After additional training, the group's aircrews departed Kearney on 25 May 1943, flying the North Atlantic route to England and into the war in Europe. Prior to the departure of aircraft and aircrews from Kearney, the 100th BG's ground echelon departed for the East Coast on 2 May 1943. On 27 May 1943, the ground personnel set sail aboard the  bound for Podington, England, from New York. At Podington the ground crews rendezvoused with the air echelon, and together moved to Thorpe Abbotts, Norfolk, where they remained throughout World War II, operating as a strategic bombardment organization.

On 25 June 1943, the 100th BG flew its first Eighth Air Force combat mission in a bombing of the Bremen U-boat yards – the beginning of the "Bloody Hundredth"'s legacy. The group focused its bombing attacks against German airfields, industries, and naval facilities in France, Germany, Poland, the Netherlands, Norway, Romania, and Ukraine. The group inherited the "Bloody Hundredth" nickname from other bomb groups due to the number of losses it took from summer to fall 1943; for example only four of the original thirty-eight co-pilots assigned to the group completed their assigned twenty-five mission tour, and there were several instances where the group lost nearly a dozen aircraft on a single mission. One such raid on 10 October 1943, that the 100th BG made on Münster, ended up with the only surviving 100th BG B-17, the Royal Flush (B-17F 42-6087) commanded for this mission by Robert Rosenthal, returning safely to Thorpe Abbots.

In August 1943, the group received its first Distinguished Unit Citation (DUC) after attacking the German aircraft factory at Regensburg on 17 August 1943, resulting in serious disruption to German fighter production. From January–May 1944, the 100th BG regularly bombed airfields, industries, marshaling yards, and missile sites in Western Europe. The group participated in the Allied campaign against German aircraft factories, Operation Argument, during "Big Week" in the last week of February 1944. In March 1944, aircrews completed a succession of attacks on Berlin and received its second DUC of the war.

While bombing during the Oil Campaign of World War II as the summer of 1944 approached, the group also conducted interdictory missions such as the June bombing of bridges and gun positions to support the Invasion of Normandy. The next month aircrews bombed enemy positions at Saint-Lô, followed by similar campaigns at Brest in August and September. In October 1944, the 100th BG attacked enemy and ground defenses in the allied drive on the Siegfried Line, then bombed marshaling yards, German occupied villages, and communication targets in the Ardennes during the Battle of the Bulge from December 1944 to January 1945. For its extraordinary efforts in attacking heavily defended German installations in Germany and dropping supplies to the French Forces of the Interior from June through December 1944, the 100th BG received the French Croix de Guerre with Palm.

The 100th BG flew its last combat mission of World War II on 20 April 1945. The following month the unit's aircrews dropped food to the people in the west of the Netherlands, and in June transported French Allied former prisoners of war from Austria to France. In December 1945, the group returned to the U.S., where it inactivated at Camp Kilmer, New Jersey, on 21 December 1945.

Cold War
On 29 May 1947, Headquarters Army Air Forces reactivated the 100th BG at Miami Army Air Field. From the time of its activation, the group trained and operated as a reserve B-29 Superfortress unit being attached to the 49th Bombardment Wing (Later Air Division). It is not clear whether or not the unit was fully manned or equipped. It was inactivated on 27 June 1949 due to budget reductions.

100th Bombardment Wing
The 100th Bombardment Wing, Medium was established on 23 March 1953 as part of Strategic Air Command, but the wing was not activated until 1 January 1956. The delay was due to construction at the unit's programmed base, Portsmouth Air Force Base (later renamed Pease AFB), New Hampshire. Construction was completed in late 1955 and, when activated, the 100th BW was assigned to the Eighth Air Force 817th Air Division.

The 100th Bomb Wing was assigned the new B-47E Stratojet swept-wing medium bombers in 1954, capable of flying at high subsonic speeds and primarily designed for penetrating the airspace of the Soviet Union.  The 100th Bomb Wing operated from Pease AFB for ten years. In official parlance, the establishment "...performed global strategic bombardment training and air refueling missions." One of the most significant overseas temporary duty assignments took place during the first four months of 1958, when the 100th participated in the last full wing B-47 deployment. During this time, the B-47s from New Hampshire operated from RAF Brize Norton, in the United Kingdom. Subsequently, overseas deployments involved the simultaneous participation of several bomb wings engaging in global strategic bombardment training and global air refueling with the Stratojet.

In the early 1960s, the B-47 was considered to be reaching obsolescence and was being phased out of SAC's strategic arsenal. In October 1965, the Air Force initiated Project Fast Fly to oversee the inactivation of the last five B-47 wings and supporting tanker squadrons. The 100th ARS retired its last tanker on 21 December 1965, when aircraft 53-0282 flew to the Military Aircraft Storage and Disposition Center at Davis-Monthan AFB, Arizona. The following day, the 100th ARS inactivated. The 100th BW retained its ground alert commitment at Pease until 31 December 1965 and inactivated on 25 June 1966.

100th Strategic Reconnaissance Wing
Headquarters SAC received authority from Headquarters USAF to discontinue its Major Command controlled (MAJCOM) wings that were equipped with combat aircraft and to activate Air Force controlled (AFCON) units, most of which were inactive at the time, which could carry a lineage and history.  On 11 February 1966, the 100th Strategic Reconnaissance Wing assumed the mission, equipment and personnel of the 4080th Strategic Reconnaissance Wing.  The 349th Strategic Reconnaissance Squadron (SRS) took over the Lockheed U-2 aircraft of the 4028th SRS and the 350th Strategic Reconnaissance Squadron took over the Ryan BQM-34 Firebee reconnaissance drones and Lockheed DC-130 launch aircraft of the 4025th SRS. The 4080th was a SAC MAJCOM wing, and its lineage terminated when it was discontinued and could not be continued by reactivation at a later date. The 100th SRW was now at Davis-Monthan AFB in Tucson, Arizona.

After its reactivation, the 100th SRW performed strategic reconnaissance with the Lockheed U-2 and drone aircraft. On 11 July 1970, the force was moved from Bien Hoa to U-Tapao RTAFB (OL-RU) and then turned to (OL-UA in Nov. 1970) Thailand. Then after the move, in November 1972 they re-activated the 99th Strategic Reconnaissance Squadron. In January 1973, the U-2s of the 99th SRS flew more than 500 combat hours. That was the first time any U-2 unit flew 500 hours in a single month. That was topped in December 1974 when they logged more than 600 hours. The 99th SRS deployed to forward operating locations as needed, earning the P.T. Cullen Award as the reconnaissance unit that contributed most to the photo and signal intelligence efforts of SAC in 1972. The U-2s were one of the last units to be pulled out of Thailand in March 1976,

With the end of United States combat operations in Southeast Asia in mid-1973, the Air Force formally transferred nuclear air sampling operations to the 100th SRW, and the 349th SRS converted its U-2s to the U-2R configuration for atmospheric sampling missions, replacing the WB-57s which it inherited from the 4028th SRS. The air sampling mission would be moved to Osan AB, South Korea, although the deployment of U-2Rs to Osan could not take place until overflight and basing arrangements were concluded with the governments of Japan and the Republic of Korea and hangar facilities made ready at Osan. Not until the Communist Chinese had actually exploded their sixteenth nuclear device on 17 June 1974, could Headquarters USAF announce that all negotiations were concluded. At the same time, it directed Headquarters SAC to deploy the 349th SRS "OLYMPIC RACE" assets to Osan and begin collecting from that location on 18 June 1974.  The sampling mission continued at Osan, and the U-2s in South Korea became the 100th SRW OL-A.

In addition to the Drone and Air Sampling missions, the 100th SRW performed worldwide surveillance missions like the monitoring of the ceasefire between the Israelis and the Egyptians following the 1973 Yom Kippur War. This operation was operated from RAF Akrotiri, Cyprus and was named operation OLIVE HARVEST – Operating Location OL-OH.

A detachment also operated from McCoy AFB, Florida until that installation's closure in 1975, followed by a move to nearby Patrick AFB, Florida, designated Operating Location LF. These U-2s engaged in OLYMPIC FIRE missions over Cuba, which were coordinated with the Joint Air Reconnaissance Control Center at NAS Key West, Florida.

100th Air Refueling Wing
In 1976 due to budget reductions, SAC consolidated its Strategic Reconnaissance assets. The 99th Strategic Reconnaissance Squadron and its U-2s were returned from U-Tapao and assigned to the 9th Strategic Reconnaissance Wing (9 SRW) on 1 July 1976. This brought all the Strategic Reconnaissance assets of SAC under one wing at Beale AFB, California. The 9th SRW already controlled the 1st Strategic Reconnaissance Squadron, which operated the SR-71 Blackbird.

The U-2Rs of the 349th SRS and the AQM-34 Firebee/DC-130 Hercules drone operations of the 350th SRS were discontinued, with the squadrons becoming KC-135 tanker squadrons of the 100th Air Refuelling Wing in support of the 9th SRS SR-71 Blackbird. The U-2Rs in South Korea became the 9th Strategic Reconnaissance Wing Detachment 2. The AQM-34s, associated DC-130 Hercules launch aircraft and CH-3 Jolly Green Giant recovery helicopters were reassigned to the Tactical Air Command's 22d Tactical Drone Squadron and remained at Davis-Monthan AFB.

With the redesignation, the 100th and its 349th and 350th Air Refueling Squadrons were moved administratively to Beale, taking over the assets of the 17th Bombardment Wing which was inactivated. The 349th and 350th assumed the KC-135s of the 903d and 922d Air Refueling Squadrons. With the re-designation, the 100th ARW assumed responsibility for providing worldwide air refueling support for the 9th SRW's SR-71s and U-2s on 30 September 1976

The 100th ARW was inactivated on 15 March 1983 when its two KC-135 squadrons were reassigned to the host 9th Strategic Reconnaissance Wing at Beale, which became a composite wing under the one-base, one-wing concept.

Post-Cold War
After an inactive status for over seven years, SAC again reactivated the 100th, but this time as the 100th Air Division at Whiteman AFB, Missouri, on 1 July 1990, an intermediate command echelon of Strategic Air Command. It assumed host unit responsibilities at Whiteman. In addition, the division controlled the 509th Bombardment Wing, a former FB-111 unit that had relocated from the former Pease Air Force Base (now Pease Air National Guard Base) due to Base Realignment and Closure (BRAC) Commission action and which was not operational while waiting for production B-2 Spirit stealth bombers to arrive and appropriate facilities for the B-2s to be constructed. It also controlled the 351st Missile Wing, an LGM-30F Minuteman II ICBM wing at Whiteman.

Air Force reorganization in 1991 put the 351st MW under the reactivated Twentieth Air Force on 29 March 1991, and the 509th Bomb Wing took over host duties at Whiteman. As a result, SAC inactivated the 100th AD again on 1 August 1991.

Air Refueling in Europe

Six months after its inactivation as an Air Division, and over 46 years after departing England at the end of World War II, the Air Force activated the 100th ARW, stationed at RAF Mildenhall, United Kingdom, on 1 February 1992. It was assigned to Strategic Air Command, Fifteenth Air Force, 14th Air Division. It was then reassigned to Third Air Force on 1 February 1992. Becoming the host wing at RAF Mildenhall, the 100th ARW took over the management of the European Tanker Task Force (ETTF).

On 31 March 1992, the 351st Air Refueling Squadron was activated and assigned to the 100th Operations Group. The 100th received its first aircraft when KC-135R 58-0100 arrived from Loring Air Force Base, Maine, in May 1992. The wing reached full strength by September 1992, when its ninth KC-135R was delivered. 

The ETTF was ended on 28 November 1998, seeing the number of KC-135R/Ts assigned to the Bloody Hundredth increased to 15 tankers.

Since its reactivation in 1992, the 100th ARW has served as United States Air Forces Europe's lone air refueling wing.

As of 2022, there is only one surviving original WW2 member of the group still living, John Luckadoo.

Lineage

100th Bombardment Group
 Established as 100th Bombardment Group (Heavy) on 28 January 1942.
 Activated on 1 June 1942.
 Redesignated 100th Bombardment Group, Heavy on 20 August 1943
 Inactivated on 21 December 1945.
 Redesignated 100th Bombardment Group, Very Heavy on 13 May 1947.
 Activated in the Reserve on 29 May 1947.
 Inactivated on 27 June 1949.

100th Air Refueling Wing
 Constituted as 100th Bombardment Wing, Medium on 23 March 1953.
 Activated on 1 January 1956.
 Inactivated on 30 April 1966
 Redesignated 100th Strategic Reconnaissance Wing on 25 June 1966
 Redesignated 100th Air Refueling Wing, Heavy on 30 September 1976.
 Inactivated on 15 March 1983.
 Consolidated with the 100th Bombardment Group on 31 January 1984 (remained inactive)
 Redesignated 100th Air Division on 15 June 1990.
 Activated on 1 July 1990.
 Inactivated on 26 July 1991.
 Redesignated 100th Air Refueling Wing, and activated, on 1 February 1992.
 Personnel designated 100th Air Expeditionary Wing when supporting Operation Allied Force effective 24 March 1999

Assignments

 III Bomber Command, 1 June 1942
 Second Air Force, 18 June 1942
 II Bomber Command, 26 June 1942
 15 Bombardment (later, 15 Bombardment Training; 15 Bombardment Operational Training) Wing, 30 November 1942
 Eighth Air Force, c. 2 June 1943
 VIII Bomber Command, c. 4 June 1943
 4th Bombardment Wing, 6 June 1943
 Attached to: 402d Provisional Combat Bombardment Wing, 6 June 1943
 3d Bombardment Division, 13 September 1943
 13th Combat Bombardment Wing (Heavy), 14 September 1943
 3d Air Division, 18 June 1945
 1st Air Division, 12 August 1945
 3d Air Division, 28 September 1945
 VIII Fighter Command, 1 November–December 1945
 49th Bombardment Wing, Very Heavy (later, 49 Air Division, Bombardment), 29 May 1947 – 27 June 1949
 Eighth Air Force, 1 January 1956
 817th Air Division, 1 February 1956 – 30 April 1966
 Attached to 7th Air Division, 29 December 1957 – 1 April 1958
 12th Strategic Aerospace Division, 25 June 1966
 14th Strategic Aerospace Division, 30 June 1971
 12th Strategic Missile (later, 12 Air) Division, 1 August 1972
 14th Air Division, 30 September 1976 – 15 March 1983
 Eighth Air Force, 1 July 1990 – 26 July 1991
 Third Air Force, 1 February 1992–present
 Air Mobility Command (forward deployed 100 AEW only), 24 March 1999 – present

Components
Wings
 351st Strategic Missile Wing: 1 July 1990 – 26 July 1991
 509th Bombardment Wing: 30 September 1990 – 26 July 1991

Groups
 100th Operations Group: 1 February 1992–present

Squadrons
 9th Air Refueling Squadron: 30 September 1976 – 27 January 1982
 99th Strategic Reconnaissance Squadron: 1 November 1972 – 30 June 1976
 100th Air Refueling Squadron: 16 August 1956 – 25 June 1966
 349th Bombardment (later, 349 Strategic Reconnaissance; 349 Air Refueling) Squadron (XR): 1 June 1942 – 1 December 1945; 29 May 1947 – 27 June 1949; 1 January 1956 – 15 March 1983
 350th Bombardment (later, 350 Strategic Reconnaissance; 350 Air Refueling) Squadron (LN) : 1 June 1942 – 15 December 1945; 16 July 1947 – 27 June 1949; 1 January 1956 – 1 July 1976 (detached 4 March-c. 4 April 1958); 28 January 1982 – 15 March 1983
 351st Bombardment Squadron (EP): 1 June 1942 – 15 December 1945; 17 July 1947 – 27 June 1949; 1 January 1956 – 25 June 1966
 418th Bombardment Squadron (LD): 1 June 1942 – 19 December 1945; 29 May 1947 – 27 June 1949; 1 March 1959 – 1 January 1962
 509th Air Refueling Squadron: attached 8 April – 8 July 1958.

100 AEW Components
 100th Expeditionary Operations Group, RAF Mildenhall, England (34 KC-135)
 351st Air Refueling Squadron (various ANG resources), 24 March – 8 April 1999
 100th Expeditionary Air Refueling Squadron, 9 April – 20 June 1999
 100th Expeditionary Group, RAF Brize Norton, England (12 KC-135)
 106th Expeditionary Air Refueling Squadron, 24 March 1999 – present
 2nd Air Expeditionary Group, RAF Fairford, England (5 KC-135)
 22d Expeditionary Air Refueling Squadron, 24 March 1999 – present

Stations

 Orlando Army Air Base, Florida 1 June 1942
 Barksdale Field, Louisiana, c. 18 June 1942
 Pendleton Field, Oregon c. 26 June 1942
 Gowen Field, Idaho, 28 August 1942
 Walla Walla, Washington, c. 1 November 1942
 Wendover Field, Utah, c. 30 November 1942
 Sioux City AAB, Iowa, c. 28 December 1942
 Kearney AAFld, Nebraska, c. 30 January – May 1943
 RAF Thorpe Abbotts (AAF-139), England, 9 June 1943 – December 1945
 Camp Kilmer, New Jersey, c. 20–21 December 1945
 Miami AAFld, Florida, 29 May 1947 – 27 June 1949
 Portsmouth (later, Pease) AFB, New Hampshire, 1 January 1956 – 25 June 1966
 Davis-Monthan AFB, Arizona, 25 June 1966 – 30 September 1976
 Beale AFB, California, 30 September 1976 – 15 March 1983
 Whiteman AFB, Missouri, 1 July 1990 – 26 July 1991
 RAF Mildenhall, United Kingdom, 1 February 1992 – present

Aircraft/missiles assigned

 Boeing B-17 Flying Fortress, 1942–1945
 Boeing B-47 Stratojet, 1956–1966
 Boeing KC-97 Stratotanker, 1956–1965
 Lockheed U-2, 1966–1976 (WU-2, 1966–1969)
 Lockheed DC-130, 1966–1976
 Boeing KC-135 Stratotanker, 1976–1983, 1992–present
 Minuteman II, 1990–1991

See also

 List of B-47 units of the United States Air Force
 100th Bomb Group Memorial Museum
 Home Front Heroes Day, a day of recognition originated by the last living original member of the World War II Eighth Air Force 100th Bomb Group, John "Lucky" Luckadoo

Notes

References

 Maurer, Maurer (1983). Air Force Combat Units of World War II. Maxwell AFB, Alabama: Office of Air Force History. .
 Ravenstein, Charles A. (1984). Air Force Combat Wings Lineage and Honors Histories 1947–1977. Maxwell AFB, Alabama: Office of Air Force History. .
 Rogers, Brian (2005). United States Air Force Unit Designations Since 1978.
 USAAS-USAAC-USAAF-USAF Aircraft Serial Numbers—1908 to present 
 March marks 10th anniversary of Operation Allied Force
 Harry H. Crosby, a navigator in the 100th BG ("Bloody Hundredth") during World War II, wrote A Wing and a Prayer: The Bloody 100th Bomb Group of the US Eighth Air Force in Action over Europe in World War II  (Harpercollins 1993 / Hdcvr  / Ppbk ). The account is an insightful look into the life of a typical air officer assigned to one of the 8th Air Force's most revered units.
 Ray Bowden, Plane Names & Bloody Noses – 100th Bomb Group. Nose art and named planes of the 100BG with brief histories and 400 black/white photos. See www.usaaf-noseart.co.uk for fuller details.

External links
Home - 100th Bomb Group (Heavy) Foundation – 100th Bomb Group Foundation

0100
Units and formations of Strategic Air Command
Military units and formations established in 1942
Military units and formations established in 1956
1942 establishments in Florida
1949 disestablishments in Florida
1956 establishments in New Hampshire